'GB1 or variant, may refer to:

 Ghostbusters (1984 film), first film in a film series
 GB-1, WWII U.S. Army Air Force glide bomb
 Game Composites GB1 GameBird, British single-engine two-seat acrobatic aircraft
 BRM Hepworth GB-1, British sports car
 gb1 domain of the G protein

See also

 
 
 GBI (disambiguation)
 GBL (disambiguation)
 GB (disambiguation)
 1GB